Leila Ali Elmi (born 16 January 1988) is an Ethiopian-born Swedish politician with Somali origin. She is a member of the Swedish Riksdag since 2018. She is a member of the Green Party, which she joined in 2014.

References

Living people
Swedish Muslims
Swedish politicians
1988 births
Members of the Riksdag 2018–2022
21st-century Swedish women politicians
Women members of the Riksdag
Swedish people of Somali descent
Members of the Riksdag 2022–2026
Members of the Riksdag from the Green Party